Xiaohe Township is a rural township in Liuyang City, Hunan Province, People's Republic of China. It is surrounded by Baishui Township on the east, Zhangfang Town on the north, Huangmao Town on the south, and Yonghe Town on the west.

Administrative divisions
As of April 2016, the village-level divisions of Xiaohe Township were adjusted from seven to five. There are five villages in the township.

Geography
The Zhushuqiao Reservoir is located in the township.

The Xiaoxi River runs northeast–southwest through the township.

Economy
Xiaohe Township's manufacturing products include fireworks.

Black goat, rabbit and pig are important to the economy.

Education
 Xiaohe Middle School

Transportation
The County road X001 runs through the town.

Celebrity
 Tang Ping, a lieutenant general in the People's Liberation Army.
 Wang Shaokun, revolutionary.
 Guo Ziming, military officer in the Chinese Red Army.

References

External links

Divisions of Liuyang
Liuyang